Exodus is an EP by Swiss heavy metal band Samael, released on 20 April 1998 through Century Media. The contents of the release were later included as bonus tracks on the 2007 re-release of Passage.

Track listing

Personnel
 Vorph – guitar, vocals 
 Masmiseim – bass
 Xy – keyboards, programming
 Kaos – guitar

References

1998 EPs
Samael (band) albums
Century Media Records EPs
Albums produced by Waldemar Sorychta